Glandora is a genus of flowering plants in the family Boraginaceae, native to the western and central Mediterranean region; Morocco, Algeria, Portugal, Spain, France, Italy and Greece. It was split from Lithodora in 2008.

Species
Currently accepted species include:

Glandora diffusa (Lag.) D.C.Thomas
Glandora gastonii (Benth.) L.Cecchi & Selvi
Glandora goulandrisiorum (Rech.f.) L.Cecchi & Selvi
Glandora moroccana (I.M.Johnst.) D.C.Thomas
Glandora nitida (Ern) D.C.Thomas
Glandora oleifolia (Lapeyr.) D.C.Thomas
Glandora prostrata (Loisel.) D.C.Thomas
Glandora rosmarinifolia (Ten.) D.C.Thomas

References

Boraginaceae
Boraginaceae genera